The FC Istiklol 2020 season is Istiklol's twelfth Tajik League season, of which they are defending Tajik League and Cup Champions, whilst they will also participate in the Tajik Supercup and AFC Champions League.

Season Events
On 14 February 2020, Istiklol announced that Shahrom Samiyev had left the club to join Rubin Kazan on a free transfer.

After Mubin Ergashev took charge of Istiklol for their two AFC Champions League matches, Vitaliy Levchenko was appointed as the club's new manager on 17 February, with Alisher Tukhtaev returning to an assistants role.

On 6 March, Shakhrom Sulaimonov joined Lokomotiv-Pamir on loan for the season, and Dzhamshed Rakhmonov was released by the club.

On 18 March, Istiklol's AFC Cup group games scheduled to take place in April, where postponed due to the COVID-19 pandemic.

On 27 March, the Tajikistan Football Federation announced that the opening round of games would be played behind closed doors due to the threat of the COVID-19 pandemic.

On 14 April, the AFC extended the postponement of the AFC Cup group games scheduled for May and June until further notice due to the continuing COVID-19 pandemic.

On 25 April, following Istiklol's 6–1 victory over Kuktosh, the Tajikistan Football Federation announced that all football would be suspended from the evening of 26 April until 10 May.

On 6 May, the Tajikistan Football Federation extended the suspension of football indefinitely due to the spread of COVID-19 pandemic in Tajikistan.

On 8 June, the Tajikistan Football Federation announced that the season would resume on 16 June, with the games continuing to be played without spectators. With the schedule being confirmed the follow day.

On 9 July, the Asian Football Confederation announced a revised calendar for the 2020 AFC Cup, with all the remaining games to be played in on country, that will be announced at a later date.

On 22 July, Istiklol announced the return of Akhtam Nazarov on a contract until the end of the 2021 season, whilst the following day Sharifbek Rakhmatov moved on loan to Lokomotiv-Pamir until the end of the season.

On 28 July, young midfielder Salam Ashurmamdov joined Istaravshan on loan for the remainder of the season.

On 6 August, midfielder Saidmuxtor Azimov joined Fayzkand on loan for the remainder of the season.

On 7 August, Istiklol announced the return of midfielder Amirbek Juraboev after a year playing for Navbahor Namangan, on a one-year contract.

On 31 August, Ehson Panjshanbe left Istiklol to join Navbahor Namangan.

During the 2020 Tajikistan Higher League season summer transfer window, Romish Jalilov was re-registered with Istiklol.

On 10 September, the 2020 AFC Cup was cancelled.

Squad

Out on loan

Transfers

In

Out

Loans out

Released

Trial

Friendlies

TFF Cup

Preliminary round

Competitions

Tajik Supercup

Tajik League

Results summary

Results by round

Results

League table

Tajikistan Cup

AFC Champions League

Qualifying stage

AFC Cup

Group stage

Squad statistics

Appearances and goals

|-
|colspan="16"|Youth team players:
|-
|colspan="16"|Players away from Istiklol on loan:

|-
|colspan="16"|Players who left Istiklol during the season:

|}

Goal scorers

Clean sheets

Disciplinary record

References

External links 
 FC Istiklol Official Web Site

FC Istiklol seasons
Istiklol